The Weston Aqueduct is an aqueduct operated by the Massachusetts Water Resources Authority (MWRA).  Now part of the MWRA backup systems, it was designed to deliver water from the Sudbury Reservoir in Framingham to the Weston Reservoir in Weston.  The  aqueduct begins at the Sudbury Dam, and passes through the towns of Southborough, Framingham, Wayland, and Weston.  In 1990, the route, buildings and bridges of the aqueduct were added to the National Register of Historic Places as the Weston Aqueduct Linear District.

History
The Weston Aqueduct was built early in the 20th century during the third phase of the evolution of the Greater Boston water supply system, now administered by the Massachusetts Water Resources Authority (MWRA).  During this phase, the other major elements of the water supply included the Sudbury Dam and Reservoir, and the Wachusett Aqueduct and Reservoir.  The purpose of the aqueduct and Weston Reservoir were to channel water to the suburbs north of Boston via Spot Pond in Stoneham.  The aqueduct was built between 1901 and 1903, under the supervision of Frederic P. Stearns, the chief engineer of the MWRA predecessor, the Metropolitan Water Board.  The buildings that shelter the aqueduct's above-ground elements were designed by Shepley, Rutan and Coolidge.  The landscaping of the aqueduct's open channel was (along with other elements of the Weston Reservoir) designed by the Olmsted Brothers.

The functions of the Weston Aqueduct and Reservoir have been taken over by the Hultman Aqueduct, built in 1941, and the MetroWest Water Supply Tunnel, completed in 2003.  They continue to be held by the MWRA as emergency-use facilities along with the Chestnut Hill Reservoir and Sudbury Aqueduct.

Description
The cross section is roughly horseshoe-shaped, with a concrete base, side walls lined in brick, and an unlined concrete arch. There are two chambers where water flow through the aqueduct is metered: both are located in Framingham, and consist of a concrete substructure, on top of which stands a small building housing equipment. These are  square, made of ashlar granite, with predominantly orange coloring, and pink-gray quoins.

There are two siphon sections where the aqueduct cross low spots in the terrain. At each end of the siphons stands a control house that is  square, styled similarly to the metering chambers. At the Weston end of the aqueduct is a channel chamber, a  hip-roofed structure from which the flow into the open channel can be regulated. The open channel is spanned by the Ash Street Bridge, a concrete arch bridge faced in stone. The Weston Reservoir was carefully designed by the Olmsted Brothers to appear natural; the final element of the aqueduct is the terminal chamber near the reservoir outlet, from which distribution pipes channel the water onward. The building housing the terminal chamber is larger and more elaborate than the other structures, but is similarly styled.

See also
National Register of Historic Places listings in Weston, Massachusetts
National Register of Historic Places listings in Framingham, Massachusetts
National Register of Historic Places listings in Middlesex County, Massachusetts
National Register of Historic Places listings in Worcester County, Massachusetts

References

External links
 Online Historic Water System Photos and Plans at mass.gov

Historic districts in Middlesex County, Massachusetts
Historic districts in Worcester County, Massachusetts
Aqueducts in Massachusetts
Buildings and structures in Framingham, Massachusetts
Southborough, Massachusetts
Buildings and structures in Wayland, Massachusetts
Weston, Massachusetts
National Register of Historic Places in Middlesex County, Massachusetts
National Register of Historic Places in Worcester County, Massachusetts
Historic districts on the National Register of Historic Places in Massachusetts
Aqueducts on the National Register of Historic Places
Transportation buildings and structures on the National Register of Historic Places in Massachusetts
National Register of Historic Places in Stoneham, Massachusetts
Crossings of the Charles River
Aqueducts in Middlesex County, Massachusetts
Transportation buildings and structures in Worcester County, Massachusetts